The 2007 Torneo Internazionale Regione Piemonte will be a professional tennis tournament played on clay courts. It will be the 8th edition of the tournament which is part of the 2007 ITF Women's Circuit. It will take place in Biella, Italy between 9 and 15 July 2007.

WTA entrants

Seeds

Other entrants
The following players received wildcards into the singles main draw:
  Silvia Disderi
  Kaia Kanepi
  Flavia Pennetta
  Urszula Radwańska

The following players received entry from the qualifying draw:
  Astrid Besser
  Margalita Chakhnashvili
  Mariya Koryttseva
  Christina Wheeler

Champions

Singles

 Agnieszka Radwańska def.  Karin Knapp, 6–3, 6–3

Doubles

 Maret Ani /  Kaia Kanepi def.  Mervana Jugić-Salkić /  Renata Voráčová, 6–4, 6–1

External links
Official Website
ITF Search 

Torneo Internazionale Regione Piemonte
Clay court tennis tournaments
Torneo Internazionale Regione Piemonte